Whitewing  may refer to:

Common chaffinch, a small bird of the finch family
Velvet scoter, a bird of the duck family
Whitewing, a character in the Warriors novel series written by Erin Hunter

See also
White Wing (disambiguation)
All pages beginning in White-wing